The 1936–37 season was the 38th season in the history of Berner Sport Club Young Boys. The team played their home games at Stadion Wankdorf in Bern and placed 2nd in the Nationalliga, and was eliminated in the second round of the Swiss Cup.

Overview

Players
 Roger Droguet
 Max Horisberger
 Walter Jäggi
 Fritz Lehmann
 Hans Liniger
 Fritz Künzi
 Aldo Poretti
 Christian Sydler
 Vilmos Sipos
 Bacher
 Paul Aebi

Friendlies

Competitions

Overall record

Nationalliga

League table

Matches

Swiss Cup

Statistics

Goalscorers

Notes

References

BSC Young Boys seasons
Swiss football clubs 1936–37 season